A microphone is an acoustic-to-electric transducer or sensor that converts sound into an electrical signal.

Microphone may also refer to:
 "Microphone" (Darin song)
 "Microphone" (Slaughterhouse song)
 Microphone (film), a 2010 Egyptian independent film
 "Microphone" a song by 98 Degrees from their 2013 studio album 2.0
 The Microphones, an American musical project
 Microphone Records, a Latvian record label and distribution company